Attapeu International Airport  is an airport that serves Attapeu in Laos. It opened in May 2015 following two years of construction. Lao Airlines provided flights from Vientiane via Pakse three times a week; however, it stopped them in October 2016 because of low passenger demand. The airport is located in Attapeu Province, which borders Vietnam and has seen greater commercial activity; however, it does not receive much tourism.

History
On 11 February 2012, officials of the Lao and Vietnamese governments attended the groundbreaking ceremony for the airport, which is located near the LaoVietnamese border. Construction began in May 2013 and ended in April 2015. Vietnam's Hoang Anh Gia Lai Group provided a loan of almost 300 billion kip (more than US$36.1 million) for the construction of the airport. The Attapeu airport officially opened on 30 May 2015 as the first international facility in the province.

In June 2015, TTR Weekly reported that neither of the two airlines providing domestic flights in Laos, Lao Airlines and Lao Skyway, had shown interest in serving Attapeu. Lao Airlines had conducted a year-long survey but found little interest. Although Attapeu Province has seen increased economic activity because of its proximity to Vietnam, it has few tourist attractions.

Nevertheless, Lao Airlines introduced twice-weekly flights from Vientiane via Pakse on 9 April 2016. The frequency was increased to thrice-weekly in July. However, Lao Airlines ended the route in October 2016 because of low passenger numbers. The following January, authorities closed down the airport for the time being.

Infrastructure
The Attapeu airport has one runway that measures . The  terminal can handle 300 passengers per day.

Access

References

Airports in Laos
Buildings and structures in Attapeu province
Airports established in 2015
2015 establishments in Laos